The Xerox Sigma 9, also known as the XDS Sigma 9, was a high-speed, general purpose computer.

Xerox first became interested in office automation through computers in 1969 and purchased Scientific Data Systems or SDS.  They then renamed the division Xerox Data Systems or XDS; they saw limited success, and the division was ultimately sold to Honeywell at a significant loss.

The Sigma 9 was announced in 1970 and the first delivery was made in 1971. There were 3 models built, the Sigma 9, the Sigma 9 Model 2 and the Sigma 9 Model 3. The original was the most powerful and was universally applicable to all data processing applications at the time. The Model 2 was able to process in multi-programmed  batch, remote batch, conversational time-sharing, real-time, and transaction processing modes. The Model 3 was designed for the scientific real-time community.

Features of the Basic Systems
All models featured a CPU with at least a floating-point arithmetic unit, Memory map with access protection, Memory write protection, Two real-time clocks, a Power fail-safe, an External interface, Ten internal interrupt levels. Also a Multiplexor input/output processor (MIOP) featuring Channel A with eight sub-channels.

Listed below are the individual specifications

Sigma 9
 CPU featuring:
 Decimal arithmetic unit
 Two 16-register general purpose register blocks
 Interrupt control chassis with eight external interrupt levels
 Memory reconfiguration control unit
 Main Memory of 64K words
 Motor generator set

Model 2
 CPU featuring:
 Decimal arithmetic unit
 Two 16-register general purpose register blocks
 Interrupt control chassis with two external interrupt levels
 Main Memory of 32K words

Model 3
 CPU featuring:
 One 16-register general purpose register blocks
 Interrupt control chassis with two external interrupt levels
 Main Memory of 32K words

Interesting facts
 The Sigma 9 had a very long run, about 10 years, and around 1980 other companies started building computers that could emulate the Sigma 9. Telefile was first and Modutest was shortly behind.
Motorola paired the Sigma 9 with the IBM 370/168 for improved function and avoidance of duplicate hardware costs.
 In 1976 the Mississippi State Central Data Processing Authority published multiple requests for Proposals to lease or purchase of a Sigma 9 to help with daily office tasks.
 In February 1975 the first Sigma 9 went online at the Online Computer Library Center (OCLC). In October 1976 the 3rd Sigma 9 went online and 2 million  records were added to the database. This continued on until 1986 when the fifteenth Sigma 9 was connected and the database contained 15 million bibliographic records.
The Xerox Sigma 9 worked very well for library databases and was used in quite a few University libraries around the country.

References

Further reading
Sigma 8, 9 Withdrawal Pains Eased With Independent Memory. (1979). DM, Data Management, 17(2), 24.

Mainframe computers
Computer-related introductions in 1971
Sigma 9